Durniok is a surname. Notable people with the surname include:
 Manfred Durniok (1934–2003), German film producer, director, and screenwriter
 Roman Durniok (1928–1993), Polish football defender